The National Parks Act is an Act of Parliament passed in New Zealand in 1980. It repealed the National Parks Act 1952.

See also
National parks in New Zealand
Tramping in New Zealand
List of Statutes of New Zealand

References

External links
Text of the Act
Department of Conservation - National Parks Act 1980

Statutes of New Zealand
1980 in New Zealand law
 
1980 in the environment